The Guindais Funicular is a funicular railway in the civil parish of Cedofeita, Santo Ildefonso, Sé, Miragaia, São Nicolau e Vitória, Portuguese municipality of Porto.

History

The original line was inaugurated on 3 June 1891. Almost exactly 2 years later, on 5 June 1893, there was an accident caused by excess velocity, and the funicular car was decommissioned. 

The former "House" of the funicular railway was by 1893 occupied by an atelier operated by sculptor Henrique Moreira. It was later remodelled to function as a meeting hall for local Jehovah's Witnesses.

As part of a larger initiative to improve the transport infrastructure of Porto, a new funicular and station was inaugurated on 19 February 2004, following the same line as before.

Architecture
The funicular is situated along the wall of Freiras, running down a steep cliff between the quay at Guindais and Rua da Batalha (terminating at building of the Civil Governor). 

Due to the difference in slope along the line, the cars have self-levelling platforms, allowing the car floor to maintain itself horizontal no matter the track incline. Although the journey is short (approximately 3 minutes) after emerging from the upper tunnel, passengers are able to view the landscape from the Dom Luís I Bridge, the river margins (including both quays along Ribeira and Cais de Gaia and the Port wine warehouses and traditional boats along the Douro River.

The service is commonly used by locals/commuters to access the river and metro services, including the metro at São Bento: the service runs from 8:00 a.m. to 8:00 p.m. on weekdays, with extended hours to midnight on weekends and holidays.

Gallery

See also 
 List of funicular railways
 Porto Metro
 Trams in Porto

References

Notes

Sources

External links 
Porto Funicular fan site

Porto Metro
Funicular Guindais
Transport infrastructure in Porto
1891 establishments in Portugal